Shahid Mansouri Qarchak Futsal Club (Bashgah-e Futsal-e Shihid Minsuri Qârcek) was an Iranian professional Futsal club based in Qarchak.

History 
The club was founded in 1997. After a string of 2nd place finishes in the league, Shahid Mansouri finally won the league for the first time in the 2010-11 season. During the same season in the 2011 AFC Futsal Club Championship they finished second after losing in the final 3-2 to Japanese club Nagoya Oceans. The club repeated as champions n the 2011–12 season. Since then the club has had several top 4 finishes in the league.

Before the 2016–17 Shahid Mansouri sold their license to Azad University and were instead placed in the 2nd Division (3rd tier).

Season-by-season 
The table below chronicles the achievements of the Club in various competitions.

Last updated: April 29, 2021

Notes:
* unofficial titles
1 worst title in history of club

Key

P   = Played
W   = Games won
D   = Games drawn
L   = Games lost

GF  = Goals for
GA  = Goals against
Pts = Points
Pos = Final position

Honours 

National:

 Iranian Futsal Super League
 Champions (2): 2010–11 - 2011–12
 Runners-up (3): 2003–04 - 2007–08 - 2009–10

Continental:

 AFC Futsal Club Championship
 Runners-up (1): 2011

Individual

 Top Goalscorer:
  2007–08:  Mohammad Taheri (52 Goals)
  2011–12:  Ahmad Esmaeilpour (32 Goals)

 Best player:
  AFC Futsal Club Championship 2011 – Mohammad Keshavarz

Players

World cup players 

 World Cup 2004
  Siamak Dadashi
  Babak Masoumi

 World Cup 2008
  Mohammad Keshavarz
  Mohammad Taheri

 World Cup 2012
  Ali Kiaei
  Ali Rahnama
  Hamid Ahmadi
  Mostafa Tayyebi
  Mohammad Taheri

Notable players

See also

 Moghavemat Qarchak
 Setaregan Varamin

References 

Futsal clubs in Iran
Shahid Mansouri FSC
Sport in Qarchak
Futsal clubs established in 1997
1997 establishments in Iran